The Beaver Mines Formation is a stratigraphic unit of Early Cretaceous (Albian) age in the Western Canada Sedimentary Basin that is present in southwestern Alberta and southeastern British Columbia, Canada. It was established by G.B. Mellon in 1967 who named it for the hamlet of Beaver Mines, Alberta. It contains a variety of plant fossils.

Lithology
Fine- to coarse-grained greenish-grey sandstone interbedded with greenish-grey mudstone and siltstone, and lesser amounts of conglomerate, bentonite, and tuff. Some conglomerate beds contain pebbles of volcanic origin. Minor argillaceous limestone is present at the top in some areas. The sandstones are feldspathic, in contrast to the quartzose sandstones of the overlying Ma Butte Formation.

Environment of deposition and paleontology
The Beaver Mines Formation was deposited in floodplain and fluvial channel environments by meandering river systems. It contains a variety of plant fossils including remains of ferns, cycads, cycadeoids, Ginkgos and extinct conifers, but remains of flowering plants do not appear until the overlying Ma Butte Formation.

Distribution and thickness
The Beaver Mines Formation is present in the southern foothills of southwestern Alberta and southeastern British Columbia and extends as far north as the Clearwater River where it grades into the Gates Formation of the Luscar Group.

Relationship to other units
The Beaver Mines Formation is part of the Blairmore Group. It disconformably overlies the Gladstone Formation and grades into the Gates Formation of the Luscar Group north of the Clearwater River. It is disconformably overlain by the Ma Butte Formation in the southern foothills and by the Blackstone Formation north of the Red Deer River. To the east, it is correlated with the upper part of the Mannville Group.

See also

 List of fossiliferous stratigraphic units in British Columbia

References

Geologic formations of Canada
Western Canadian Sedimentary Basin
Stratigraphy of Alberta
Cretaceous Alberta
Stratigraphy of British Columbia
Cretaceous British Columbia
Albian Stage